Kezban is a 1953 Turkish romance film directed by Hicri Akbasli and starring Bülent Oran, Gönül Bayhan and Muzaffer Nebioglu.

Cast
 Bülent Oran 
 Gönül Bayhan 
 Muzaffer Nebioglu 
 Muhterem Nur 
 Cahit Irgat
 Ayten Çakar

External links
 

1953 films
1950s romance films
1950s Turkish-language films
Turkish romance films
Turkish black-and-white films
Films based on Turkish novels